The Francisco Fajardo Highway is the most important freeway of Caracas, connecting the west and east sides of the city. The national freeways and many of the avenues of Caracas are not designated with a system of codification or numbering; instead they are designated with the names of historical personages. This highway is named for the conquistador Francisco Fajardo. Also in Caracas, the connections between freeways are also given peculiar names - the octopus, the spider and the centipede are examples.

Overview
The freeway's respective branches go from Petare and connect with the Grand Marshal Ayacucho Highway (Petare-Guarenas section), and to the southwest of Caracas through the La Paz neighborhood finishing in Las Adjuntas and Macarao. there is also a subbranch to Caricuao. The main branches are the East Highway that starts from the Centipede connection (in the Chacao Municipality) and finishes in the La Trinidad section of Caracas. At La Trinidad, El Hatillo avenue begins; it ends in the La Lagunita neighborhood. the second branch goes towards the south of the city and is named Valle-Coche Highway. It terminates with a connection to the Regional del Centro Highway. Another branch goes from Catia to the beginning of the Caracas-La Guaira Highway.

Tunel El Paraiso

Tunel El Paraiso is a  vehicular tunnel along the Francisco Fajardo Highway . It was built from 1967 to 1968 and has two lanes for both directions of travel.

See also
Caracas
Baruta Municipality
Sucre Municipality
Chacao Municipality
Libertador Municipality
Venezuelan Capital District

Baruta Municipality
Buildings and structures in Caracas
Transport in Caracas
Roads in Venezuela